Abd al-Fattah Ismail Ali Al-Jawfi (28 July 1939 – 13 January 1986) was the Marxist de facto leader of People's Democratic Republic of Yemen from 1969 to 1980. He served as Chairman of the Presidium of the Supreme People's Council (head of state) and founder, chief ideologue and first leader of the Yemeni Socialist Party from 21 December 1978 to 21 April 1980. He died under mysterious circumstances during the 1986 South Yemen Civil War, where no body was found.

Biography
Born in July 1934 in the Hugariah district, Taiz of North Yemen, he was educated in Aden, where he subsequently worked in an oil refinery from 1956 to 1959 as an apprentice. As a co-founder of the Arab Nationalist Movement in South Yemen, he contributed to the formation of a number of Movement cells before he was arrested by the British authorities in Aden for political incitement of workers.

In 1961 he became a school teacher in one of the Aden districts, and at the same time continuing political activity. He was a co-founder of the National Front for the Liberation of South Yemen (NLF). After the NLF started the 14 October 1963 Revolution for the liberation of South Yemen from British colonial rule, Ismail became a full-time socialist revolutionary, whereby he undertook the leadership of the NLF underground military wing (fedayeen) in Aden, as well as political activity.

He was elected to the NLF executive in the first, second and third NLF congresses, 1965–67. After South Yemen gained independence in 1967 he was appointed Minister of Culture and Yemeni Unity. In the fourth NLF congress, he was instrumental in determining the progressive line of the revolution. But in March 1968 he was arrested by the right wing of the NLF and went into exile, where he drafted the program for Accomplishing National Democratic Liberation, a leftist manifesto. He undertook a leading role in the consolidation of left wing of NLF which subsequently regained power in the 22 June 1969 "Correction Step."

Subsequent to the "Correction Step" Ismail was elected Secretary General of the NLF Central Committee, thus making him the country's de facto leader.  He was also elected a member of the Presidium of the Supreme People's Council. In 1970 he was elected Chairman of Presidium. He undertook a leading role in the dialogue between NLF and other left parties in south Yemen leading to the formation of the Yemeni Socialist Party (YSP). He was elected Secretary General of the YSP at the first party congress in October 1978. Ideologically, he is considered to have favored the Soviet model of socialist development (as opposed to Maoist alternatives). In October 1979, Ismail secured the 1979 Treaty of Friendship and Cooperation with the USSR. Similar treaties with East Germany and Ethiopia followed in 1981, following Ismail's resignation from office. 

In 1980 he resigned from all his posts for allegedly health reasons and was succeeded by Ali Nasir Muhammad. However, Ismail was appointed president of the party before he went to Moscow for medical treatment, until 1985, when he returned in the face of a mounting crisis between Muhammad and his opponents in the YSP.

In October 1985 he was elected to the YSP Politburo and as a Secretary of the Central Committee, but the crisis had erupted on January 13, 1986, into a violent struggle in Aden between Ali Nasir's supporters and Ismail's supporters (See South Yemen Civil War). Fighting lasted for more than a month and resulted in thousands of casualties, Ali Nasir's ouster, and Ismail's mysterious disappearance. He was allegedly killed when naval forces loyal to Ali Nasir shelled his home in Aden.

References

External links
Russian political detective series (2006) after A.Konstantinov's novel "The Journalist" (1996) with its fictionalized version of the events
Anaween Thaqafiya magazine
Salah Abdul Fattah interview on 26 September, April 27, 2006

|-

Presidents of South Yemen
Chairmen of the Presidium of the Supreme People's Council
1939 births
1986 deaths
Arab communists
Communism in Yemen
Yemeni Arab nationalists
Yemeni Marxists
Yemeni Socialist Party politicians
Yemeni socialists
People granted political asylum in the Soviet Union
South Yemen independence activists